Larkfield was a single-member county constituency of the Parliament of Northern Ireland.

Boundaries and boundary changes
Before 1969, the area formed part of the Northern Ireland Parliament constituencies of Mid-Down and South Antrim.

Larkfield was created by the Electoral Law Act (Northern Ireland) 1968 as a division of County Antrim. It was located to the south-west of Belfast, straddling the Upper Malone Road, Upper Lisburn Road and M1 motorway, and comprised "part of the rural district of Lisburn which consists of the district electoral divisions of Andersonstown, Ardmore, Ballygammon, Dunmurry, Finaghy, Ladybrook, and Upper Malone". The boundaries of those divisions are set out in the Lisburn Rural District (Electoral Areas) Order (NI) 1963.

The constituency sent one MP to the House of Commons of Northern Ireland at the 1969 Northern Ireland general election. The Parliament was prorogued on 30 March 1972, under the terms of the Northern Ireland (Temporary Provisions) Act 1972. It was formally abolished in 1973 when the Northern Ireland Constitution Act 1973 received Royal Assent on 18 July 1973.

The parliamentary representative of the division was elected using the first-past-the-post system.

Member of Parliament

Election results

 Parliament prorogued 30 March 1972 and abolished 18 July 1973

References
 Northern Ireland Parliamentary Election Results 1921-1972, compiled and edited by Sydney Elliott (Political Reference Publications 1973)
Northern Ireland House of Commons, 1921 - 1972

External links
 For more information about the Northern Ireland House of Commons, see http://www.election.demon.co.uk/stormont/stormont.html 

Constituencies of the Northern Ireland Parliament
Northern Ireland Parliament constituencies established in 1969
Historic constituencies in County Antrim
Historic constituencies in County Down
Northern Ireland Parliament constituencies disestablished in 1973